Paul D. Marks (died February 28, 2021) was an American novelist and short story writer. His novel White Heat, a mystery-thriller set during the Rodney King riots of 1992, won the first Shamus Award for Independent Private Eye Novel from the Private Eye Writers of America.

His story "Ghosts of Bunker Hill" (EQMM December 2016) was voted #1 in Ellery Queen Mystery Magazine’s 2016 Readers Choice Award and was nominated for a Macavity Award for Best Short Story. "Bunker Hill Blues" (EQMM September/October 2017) came in #6 in the 2018 Ellery Queen Mystery Magazine's poll. "Howling at the Moon" (EQMM November 2014) was short-listed for both the 2015 Anthony Award and Macavity Award for Best Short Story, and came in #7 in Ellery Queen’s Reader’s Choice Award. Marks’ story “Windward” from the Coast to Coast: Private Eyes from Sea to Shining Sea anthology was selected for the 2018 Best American Mystery Stories (Houghton Mifflin Harcourt), edited by Louise Penny & Otto Penzler. "Windward" also won the 2018 Macavity Award for Best Short Story and was short-listed for the 2018 Shamus Award for Best Short Story and was a 2018 Derringer finalist in the Best Novelette category. Coast to Coast: Private Eyes from Sea to Shining Sea, which was co-edited by Marks and Andrew McAleer, was nominated for a 2018 Anthony Best Anthology award. "Fade-out on Bunker Hill" (EQMM March/April 2019) came in #2 in Ellery Queen Mystery Magazine's 2019 Readers Choice Award.

His fiction was recognized by the SouthWest Writers, Lorian Hemingway International Short Story Competition, Futures Fire to Fly, Southern Writers Association, Deadly Ink Short Story Competition, and Glimmer Train Very Short Fiction.

His short fiction was published in Ellery Queen Mystery Magazine, Akashic’s Noir series (St. Louis), Alfred Hitchcock Mystery Magazine, Crimestalker Casebook and more. He was co-editor of the Coast to Coast: Sea to Shining Sea mystery anthologies from Down & Out Books.

According to Steven Bingen, co-author of MGM: Hollywood’s Greatest Backlot, Marks was also the last person to have shot a film on the MGM backlot. “That 40 page chronological list I mentioned of films shot at the studio ends with his [Paul D. Marks’] name on it.”

He served on the boards of the Los Angeles chapters of Sisters in Crime and the Mystery Writers of America.

Career 

A native of Los Angeles, much of Marks’ writing was inspired by the city’s history and culture. Los Angeles and Southern California is often as much a “character” in his work as the human characters. Novelist and Anthony Award finalist, S.W. Lauden has said of Marks’ work: “…[it’s] almost as if the region was one of the main characters.”

His stories often dealt with the changing nature of the city and the displacement it causes people. His characters were frequently people who time has passed by or who no longer fit in today’s society.

Marks’ first novel, the Shamus-Award winning White Heat, takes place during the Rodney King Riots and deals with race and racism in the context of a mystery-thriller. Vortex, his second full length work, is also set in Los Angeles and updates the noir theme of a soldier returning home from war feeling alienated. Both are heavily influenced by the Los Angeles region and vibe. His Ellery Queen Reader's Choice Award-winning short story, Ghosts of Bunker Hill, is set in the Angelino Heights community of old Victorian houses and LA’s downtown Bunker Hill neighborhood, and was inspired by his explorations of the area before it was torn down for redevelopment.

Though mostly known for mystery novels, crime and noir fiction, he wrote in a variety of genres, including mainstream and literary. Terminal Island, the story of Japanese immigrants in a fishing community off the coast of Los Angeles and their interaction with a new white neighbor during World War II was published in Weber: The Contemporary West.

Marks’ influences included Raymond Chandler, Dashiell Hammett, David Goodis, Dorothy B. Hughes, John Fante, Ross Macdonald, Walter Mosley, James Ellroy and even artist Edward Hopper. He also was influenced by film noir, Los Angeles history, including the Hollywood “dream factories,” and various styles of music.

He studied short story writing under T.C. Boyle, at USC. Marks' non-fiction articles have appeared in the Los Angeles Daily News, the Los Angeles Herald Examiner, and American Premiere magazine. He was also a contributing editor to The Hollywood Gazette.

Marks blogged on a periodic basis at: 7CriminalMinds.blogspot.com and SleuthSayers.org

Bibliography

P.I. Duke Rogers Series 

 White Heat, Marks’ Shamus Award-winning novel, re-published May, 2018 by Down & Out Books. 
 Broken Windows, the sequel to White Heat, September, 2018 by Down & Out Books.

Editor 

 Coast to Coast Anthologies:
 Coast to Coast: Murder from Sea to Shining Sea, September 2015, co-edited with Andrew McAleer and includes the Shamus Award-nominated story The Dead Detective by Robert Levinson
 Coast to Coast: Private Eyes from Sea to Shining Sea, January 2017, also co-edited with Andrew McAleer and includes the Agatha Award-nominated story A Necessary Ingredient by Art Taylor
 Coast to Coast: Noir from Sea to Shining Sea, September 2020, also co-edited with Andrew McAleer. Was named "Best of 2020" by Suspense Magazine in the Anthology category.

Stand-Alones 

 The Blues Don't Care (a Bobby Saxon Mystery), June 2020
 Vortex, September 2015
 L.A. Late @ Night: 5 Noir & Mystery Tales from the Dark Streets of Los Angeles, February 2014

Awards and nominations

References

External links 
 Official website

Year of birth missing (living people)
Living people
American male novelists
American male short story writers
Shamus Award winners
Place of birth missing (living people)
21st-century American novelists
21st-century American short story writers
21st-century American male writers